The Mvurwi range of mountains is located in northern Zimbabwe. It stretches about 160 km from Lake Manyame, just west of Harare, north to the Zambezi Escarpment. Its high point is at about 1728 metres. It is an important chromium mining region.

Mountains of Zimbabwe